Primauguet was a F70 type anti-submarine frigate of the French Marine Nationale. She was the sixth French vessel named after the 15th century captain Hervé de Portzmoguer.
She was one of the seven anti-submarine frigates made of the same class as the french frigate Latouche-Tréville She was decommissioned in April 2019.
Note: The French navy doesn't use the term "destroyer" for its ships; hence some large ships, referred to as "frigates", are registered as destroyers.

Sources and references 

 http://www.defense.gouv.fr/marine/equipements/batiments-de-combat/fregates/asm-type-f70/primauguet-d-644
 Baker, A.D. The Naval Institute Guide to Combat Fleets of the World 1998–1999. Annapolis, Maryland, USA: Naval Institute Press, 1998. .
 NetMarine

Georges Leygues-class frigates
Frigates of France
Ships built in France
1984 ships